Flaxman Low is a fictional character created by British authors Hesketh Hesketh-Prichard and his mother, Kate O'Brien Ryall Prichard, published  under the pseudonyms "H. Heron" and "E. Heron". Low is credited with being the first psychic detective of fiction, and appears in a series of short stories.

Description
Flaxman Low is a pseudonym for “one of the leading scientists of the” Victorian era, whose real name is not disclosed in the stories. He was an accomplished athlete in his youth and has turned his interests to a scientific study of the occult.

Stories
From 1898-1899 press baron Cyril Arthur Pearson published six Flaxman Low stories in his monthly Pearson's Magazine, though the authors were disconcerted to find the tales promoted by Pearson as "real". The collected work was published as Ghosts: Being the Experiences of Flaxman Low in 1899.

The stories are as follows:
 "The Story of the Spaniards, Hammersmith" (1898)
 "The Story of Medhans Lea" (1898)
 "The Story of the Moor Road" (1898)
 "The Story of Baelbrow" (1898)
 "The Story of Yand Manor House" (1898)
 "The Story of the Grey House" (1899)
 "The Story of Saddler's Croft" (1899)
 "The Story of Sevens Hall" (1899)
 "The Story of No. 1 Karma Crescent" (1899)
 "The Story of Konnor Old House" (1899)
 "The Story of Crowsedge" (1899)
 "The Story of Mr Flaxman Low" (1899)

By other authors
The Improbable Adventures of Sherlock Holmes (2009) includes a short story by author Barbara Roden, "The Things That Shall Come Upon Them", which teams up Flaxman Low with Sherlock Holmes who together investigate a haunted house mystery.

References

External links 
 Flaxman Low, Occult Psychologist, Collected Stories, Project Gutenberg Australia
 
 

Low, Flaxman
Low, Flaxman
Occult detective fiction